Mount Stearns is a mountain rising to  named after Charles R. Stearns, Dept. of Meteorology, University of Wisconsin;  he designed and positioned automatic weather stations.

Mountains of Victoria Land
Scott Coast